The discography of Architects, a British metalcore band, consists of ten studio albums, one split EP, two live albums, one video album, one demo album, twenty-seven singles and 36 music videos. Formed in Brighton in 2004, the group originally consisted of vocalist Matt Johnson, guitarists Tom Searle and Tim Hillier-Brook, bassist Tim Lucas and drummer Dan Searle, who released the band's debut album Nightmares in 2006. In 2007, Johnson was replaced by Sam Carter and Lucas was replaced by Ali Dean, and the band released its second album Ruin. Hollow Crown followed on Century Media Records in 2009, which was the band's first album to register on the UK Albums Chart, reaching number 117. The band released The Here and Now in January 2011, which reached number 57 on the UK Albums Chart and topped the UK Rock & Metal Albums Chart.

Dean briefly left Architects shortly after the release of The Here and Now, but returned a few months later. The band's fifth album Daybreaker was released in 2012, reaching number 42 on the UK Albums Chart and topping the UK Rock & Metal Albums Chart. Hillier-Brook left the band shortly before the release of Daybreaker, with Sylosis frontman Josh Middleton temporarily taking his place. After signing with Epitaph Records, the band issued Lost Forever // Lost Together in 2014, which reached the UK top 20 and charted on the US Billboard 200 for the first time in the band's career, reaching number 125. Later in the year, Adam Christianson joined as the latest in a line of touring guitarists (he previously had a brief stint in 2012), before he would later become an official member of the band in 2015.

In May 2016, Architects released their seventh album All Our Gods Have Abandoned Us. The album reached number 15 in the UK, the top ten in Australia and Germany, and number 109 in the US. The album was the band's last to feature guitarist Tom Searle, who died from cancer on 20 August 2016. Searle's brother Dan, the band's drummer, admitted that "I don't know what will become of Architects", casting doubt on the future of the band. The band announced that they were working on new material in August 2017, and a week later released their first song since Searle's death, "Doomsday". Holy Hell was released on 9 November 2018. Their ninth studio album, For Those That Wish to Exist, was released on 26 February 2021. Its follow-up and the tenth studio album, The Classic Symptoms of a Broken Spirit, was released on 21 October 2022.

Albums

Studio albums

Live albums

Video albums

Demo albums

Split EPs

Singles

Other charted songs

Music videos

References

External links
Architects official website

Architects
Architects